Gymnocarena bicolor is a species of tephritid or fruit flies in the genus Gymnocarena of the family Tephritidae.

Distribution
Mexico & United States.

References

Tephritinae
Insects described in 1960
Diptera of North America